The Brown Fire was a wildfire that burned in Lund, Nevada in the United States. First reported on June 24, 2020, the Brown Fire burned  and was contained on June 30, 2020. The fire skirted along Highway 318 and threatened the south side of Lund, resulting in the mandatory evacuation of residents in the southern part of the community. The cause of the fire remains under investigation.

Events

The Brown Fire was first reported on June 24, 2020 around 3:00 pm EST, burning on the south and east side of the community of Lund, Nevada. This resulted in the mandatory evacuation of the south side of Lund and the closure of Highway 318 at Lanes Coffee Shop & Travel Store. By the evening of June 24, residents were allowed to return to their homes. 

The Brown Fire was contained on June 30, 2020 and burned .

Impact

The Brown Fire's rapid growth towards the small town of Lund resulted in residents on the south side of the community to be evacuated on June 24. They were allowed to return that same evening. Parts of Highway 318 were also closed, as the fire burned close to roadway.

Smoke from the fire impacted air quality in various regions, including Washington County, Utah.

See also
2020 Nevada wildfires

References

2020 Nevada wildfires
History of White Pine County, Nevada